A flatbread is a bread made with flour; water, milk, yogurt, or other liquid; and salt, and then thoroughly rolled into flattened dough. Many flatbreads are unleavened, although some are leavened, such as pizza and pita bread.

Flatbreads range from below one millimeter to a few centimeters thick so that they can be easily eaten without being sliced. They can be baked in an oven, fried in hot oil, grilled over hot coals, cooked on a hot pan, tava, comal, or metal griddle, and eaten fresh or packaged and frozen for later use.

History
Flatbreads were amongst the earliest processed foods, and evidence of their production has been found at ancient sites in Mesopotamia, ancient Egypt, and the Indus civilization.

In 2018, charred bread crumbs were found at a Natufian site called Shubayqa 1 in Jordan (in Harrat ash Shaam, the Black Desert) dating to 12,400 BC, some 4,000 years before the start of agriculture in the region. Analysis showed that they were probably from flatbread containing wild barley, einkorn wheat, oats, and Bolboschoenus glaucus tubers (a kind of rush).

Primitive clay ovens (tandir) used to bake unleavened flatbread were common in Anatolia during the Seljuk and Ottoman eras, and have been found at archaeological sites distributed across the Middle East. The word tandır comes from the Akkadian tinuru, which becomes tannur in Hebrew and Arabic, tandır in Turkish, and tandur in Urdu/Hindi. Of the hundreds of bread varieties known from cuneiform sources, unleavened tinuru bread was made by adhering bread to the side walls of a heated cylindrical oven. This type of bread is still central to rural food culture in this part of the world, reflected by the local folklore, where a young man and woman sharing fresh tandır bread is a symbol of young love, however, the culture of traditional bread baking is changing with younger generations, especially with those who reside in towns showing preference for modern conveniences.

List of flatbreads

Europe 

 Bannock (Scotland): a quick bread baked from grain
 Blini (Russia)
 Bolo do caco (Madeira, Portugal)
 Borlengo (Italy)
 Farl (Ireland and Scotland)
 Flammkuchen/Tarte flambée (Alsace): thin bread dough rolled out in a circle or a rectangle and covered with onions and lardons
 Flatbrød (Norway): barley flour, salt and water, or potato, flour and salt, or peas flour and salt.
 Flatkaka (Iceland): rye flatbread
 Focaccia (Italy)
 Ftira (Malta)
 Hoggan (Cornwall): made from barley flour containing pieces of pork, and potato
 Hönökaka (Bohuslän): made from wheatmeal. The name is the commercial variant of the traditional name "bagebröd", meaning "baked bread". 
 Lagana (Greece)
 Shotis Puri (Georgia)
 Tonis puri (Georgia)
 Lángos (Hungary)
 Lefse (Norway)
 Tandyr nan (Central Asia)
 Oatcake (United Kingdom)
 Pane carasau (Sardinia, Italy)
 Piadina (Italy): white flour, lard (or olive oil), salt and water
 Pinsa (Rome): wheat and other flours, such as barley, rice, oats, and millet
 Pita (Greece)
 Pită/Lipie/Turtă (Romania)
 Pissaladière (France)
 Pizza (Italy)
 Podpłomyk (Poland)
 Posúch (Slovakia)
 Parlenka (Bulgaria)
 Rieska (Finland)
 Somun and Lepina (Bosnia and Herzegovina)
 Spianata sarda (Sardinia, Italy)
 Staffordshire oatcake (England)
 Tigella (Italy)
 Torta (Spain)
 Torta al testo (Umbria, Italy)
 Torta de Gazpacho (Spain)
 Tunnbröd (Sweden): any combination of wheat, barley and rye

Middle East and Africa 

 Barbari (Iran)
 Bataw (Egypt)
 Bazlama (Turkey): made from wheat flour, water, and salt
 Chapati (Swahili coast, Uganda)
 Eish merahrah (Egypt): made with 5–10% ground fenugreek seeds and maize
 Gözleme (Turkey): folded over a savoury filling and fried on a griddle
 Gurassa (Sudan)
 Harcha (Morocco): fried buttery bread made of semolina
 Injera (Horn of Africa): teff flour
 Khebz (Levant)
 Khubz (Arabian Peninsula)
 Khubz Asmr (Saudi Arabia) (Arabian Peninsula): made of wholemeal flour, yeast, and salt
 Khubz al-Jamri (Arabia, Northern Yemen): ash cake made by burying dough in hot ashes and embers. 
 Kisra, (Sudan)
 Lahoh (Somalia, Djibouti, Yemen)
 Lavash (Turkey and Armenia)
 Moroccan Frena
 Lebanese Bread (Lebanon): white flour, dried yeast, sugar, salt and water
 Malooga (Yemen): water, yeast, salt and flour
 Markook (Levant)
 Matnakash (Armenia)
 Matzo (Jewish): white plain flour and water
 Mulawah (Yemen)
 M'lawi (Tunisia): water, olive oil, semolina and flour
 Murr (Israel)
 Muufo (Somalia)
 Ngome (Mali): millet, water and vegetable oil
 Pita (Eastern Mediterranean, Turkey and Middle East)
 Pogača (Balkans and Turkey)
 Sabaayad (Somalia and Djibouti)
 Saj bread (Lebanon, Turkey, Israel)  
 Sangak (Iran)
 Taftan (Iran)
 Yufka (Turkey): wheat flour, water and salt
 Taboon bread, (Lebanon)

Central Asia 

 Afghan bread or "Nan" (Afghanistan)
 Bolani (Afghanistan): a vegetarian flat-bread dish
 Obi Non (Afghanistan and Uzbekistan)
 Shelpek (Kazakhstan)
 Tandoor-nan (Central Asia)
 Tapansha, Taba nan (Kazakhstan)

East Asia

 Bindaeddeok (Korea): pancake made from mung bean flour
 Bing (China)
 Green onion pancake (China): made with oil and minced scallions (green onions)
 Laobing (China)
 Sanchuisanda (China)
 Shaobing (China)
 Guokui (China): stuffed flatbread made from wheat

South Asia
 Aloo paratha (India and Pakistan)
 Akki rotti (India)
 Appam (India): pancake made from fermented rice batter and coconut milk
 Bakarkhani (Bangladesh)
 Bhakri (India): made with water and millet flour
 Bhatura (Indian subcontinent): made with white flour, yogurt, ghee (or oil), and yeast
 Chapati (Indian subcontinent): made from atta flour (whole grain durum wheat), water
 Chili parotha (India)
 Chikkolee (India)
 Dhebra (India)
 Dosa (India): batter made from rice and black gram fried on a griddle
 Gobi paratha (India and Pakistan)
 Jolada rotti (India)
 Kalai roti (Bangladesh)
 Kaak (Pakistan)
 Kachori (Indian subcontinent)
 Kothu parotta (India)
 Kulcha (Indian subcontinent)
 Luchi (India and Bangladesh): fine maida flour with water and a spoonful of ghee
 Makki di roti (India and Pakistan)
 Mughlai paratha (India and Bangladesh)
 Pathiri (India): is a traditional roti that originated from Malabar cuisine.
 Naan (Indian subcontinent and Central Asia): leavened with yeast, unlike Roti bread
 Paratha (Indian subcontinent)
 Parotta (India and Sri Lanka)
 Pesarattu (India): pancake made from green gram (Mung) batter
 Phulka (Indian subcontinent): made from whole wheat flour, water and salt. It is like a baked variety of Puri.
 Poli (India): made from whole wheat flour, water and salt. It is folded and layered round flat bread.
 Pol roti (Sri Lanka): made from scraped coconut and wheat or kurakkan flour, with green chillis and onion
 Puri (Indian subcontinent): prepared from dough of atta and salt
 Ragi rotti (India and Sri Lanka)
 Roast paan (Sri Lanka): bread mixture baked in a flat mold, producing, literally, a 'flat' bread.
 Roti (Indian subcontinent)
 Rumali roti (Indian subcontinent)
 Sheermal (Indian subcontinent and Iran)
 Taftan (Indian subcontinent and Iran)

Southeast Asia

 Aparon (Philippines)
 Bánh (Vietnam)
 Kabkab (Philippines)
 Khanom buang (Thailand): rice flour
 Kiping (Philippines)
 Piaya (Philippines)
 Roti prata (Singapore)
 Roti canai (Brunei, Indonesia, Malaysia, Singapore and Thailand)
 Roti tissue (Indonesia and Malaysia)

Americas 

 Arepa (Colombia, Venezuela): flat, unleavened patty made of cornmeal
 Bammy (Jamaica): made from grated cassava root or cassava flour and salt
 Bannock (food):  a variety of flat quick bread or any large, round article baked or cooked from grain
 Beiju (Brazil): made from tapioca
 Casabe (South America, Caribbean): made from bitter cassava root
 Frybread (United States)
 Native American Flatbread (North America): made from maize flour in a traditional style of early Native Americans; now topped with ground beef, vegetables, beans and cheese
 Pan de semita (Mexico)
 Piki (Hopi): made very thin from blue corn and baked on a hot flat stone
 Pupusa (El Salvador)
 Johnnycake (North America and Caribbean)
 Tortilla (Mexico, Central and South America): either as corn tortilla or flour tortilla
 Tortilla de Rescoldo (Chile): wheat flour based bread, traditionally baked in the coals of a campfire

See also

 List of ancient dishes and foods
 List of baked goods
 List of breads

References

Further reading
 2005. "High-Profile Flatbreads - Say Goodbye to Insipid White Bread When Tortillas and Flatbreads Come to Town". FOOD PRODUCT DESIGN -NORTHBROOK-. 15, no. 1: 96-114. .
 2008. "Flatbreads Old World: Meets New Flatbreads from All Over the World-Including Tortillas, Arepas and Naan-Are the Newest Hot Ticket in Both Retail and Foodservice Products". FOOD PRODUCT DESIGN -NORTHBROOK-. 18, no. 11: 38-43.
 2008. "Storied Breads: With a Continuing Focus on Food Origin, Flatbreads Offer Manufacturers a Way to Tempt Consumers with Authentic Products Celebrating the Oldest-Known Bread Traditions". BAKING AND SNACK. 30, no. 7: 35-42. .
 2011. "Flat-Out in Love with Flatbread Here Are 5 Reasons Foodservice Is Smitten with Flatbreads". FOOD MANAGEMENT -NEW YORK THEN CLEVELAND OH-. 46, no. 11: 30-35. .
 Alford, Jeffrey, and Naomi Duguid. Flatbreads and Flavors: A Baker's Atlas. New York: W. Morrow, 1995. Summary: Recipes for more than sixty varieties of flatbreads along with 150 recipes for traditional accompaniments to the breads, including chutneys, curries, salsas, stews, mezze, smorgasbord, kebabs, etc.
 Craddock, Anne. Textural Characteristics of Bagels and Ethnic Flatbreads. 1998. Thesis. 124 leaves.
 German, Donna Rathmell. Flatbreads from Around the World. San Leandro, Calif: Bristol Pub, 1994.
 Hansen, Eric. 2015. "Fabled Flatbreads of Uzbekistan." Aramco World. July/August 2015. Pages 32–39.
 Helou, Anissa. Savory Baking from the Mediterranean: Focaccias, Flatbreads, Rusks, Tarts, and Other Breads. New York: William Morrow, 2007.
 Kahlon, Talwinder Singh, and Mei-Chen Maggie Chiu. 2014. "Ancient Whole Grain Gluten-Free Flatbreads". Food and Nutrition Sciences. 05, no. 17: 1717-1724.

 
Ancient dishes
Flatbreads

pt:Pão ázimo